The Gwda is a river in Poland, a tributary of the Noteć. It begins at Lake Studnica, northeast of Szczecinek. Its upper course flows through many lakes. It runs through the town of Piła.

Special fishing rules and regulations regarding trout are in effect for the following sections of the Gwda:
Downstream from Koszalin Province boundary and upstream from road bridge in Ledyczek excluding reservoir between Wegorzewo and Lomczewo.
Downstream from road bridge in Ledyczek and upstream from Podgaje Reservoir.
Downstream from dam in Tarnowka and upstream from road bridge in Krepsko.

The water of the Gwda was one of the purest in Poland in 1975. However, the water flows have since been degraded due to cities pumping non-processed sewage and industrial plants flushing chemicals and oil.

References

 Ilnicki, P., Melcer, B., Posiewka, P. (2003) "Point and non-point sources of pollution in the Gwda river basin in hydrological years 1992/93-1997/98" Journal of Water and Land Development, No. 7, pp. 65–73.

Rivers of Poland
Rivers of Greater Poland Voivodeship